Esther Augustine (born 8 July 1987) is a Nigerian judoka who competed in the women's category. She won a silver medal at the 2011 All-Africa Games and a bronze medal at the 2008 African Judo Championships. She won the African Open Port Louis U63kg in 2013.

Sports career 
At the 2008 African Judo Championships in Agadir, Morocco, Augustine competed in the 63kg event and won a bronze medal.

At the Africa Games held in Maputo, Mozambique. She won a silver medal in the 63kg event. She also won the African Open that held in Port Louis after participating in the U63kg event.

References

External links 
Esther Augustine - African Judo
Esther Augustine profile

Living people
1987 births
Nigerian female judoka
Competitors at the 2011 All-Africa Games
African Games medalists in judo
African Games silver medalists for Nigeria
20th-century Nigerian women
21st-century Nigerian women